The Criminal Investigation Department (CID) is a specialized intelligence and investigation wing of the Bangladesh Police. It is headquartered in Malibagh, Dhaka and maintains a training school named the Detective Training School. Personnel attached to this wing essentially work in plain clothes. Mohammad Ali Mia, BPM, PPM is the head of the Criminal Investigation Department.

History 
In 2009, the Criminal Investigation Department in Chittagong received an advance forensic lab facility.

The South Korean government provided training to 15 officers of the Criminal Investigation Department from 24 November to 10 December 2011 through the Korea International Cooperation Agency at Korea Police Investigation Academy.

Following attacks on the indigenous Santal community in Gaibandha District in 2019 the Criminal Investigation Department was appointed to investigate. The charge sheet submitted by the CID was rejected by the Santal Community who alleged names of local Member of Parliament, Md. Abul Kalam Azad, and Managing Director of state owned Rangpur Sugar Mill, Abdul Awal, was not included in the charge sheet but that of a dead Awami League leader was included. The Santal plaintiff filed a no confidence petition against the charge sheet with Gobindaganj court in January 2020. 

The Criminal Investigation Department arrested a man on charge of making derogatory comments about the first doctor to die in the COVID-19 pandemic in Bangladesh. On 6 July 2020, the Criminal Investigation Department started investigations against Member of Parliament Mohammad Shahid Islam, who had been detained in Kuwait on human trafficking and corruption charges. On 22 November 2020, the CID arrested Tithy Sarkar, a student of Jagannath University, who was accused of making "derogatory" comments about Islam and Prophet Mohamad. She had been missing since October 2020 when the comments first emerged on social media.

The Criminal Investigation Department announced plans to establish a central database of licensed weapons in Bangladesh on 24 March 2021 using Automated Ballistic Identification Systems.

The Deputy Inspector General of the Cyber Wing of the Criminal Investigation Department, Jamil Ahmed, investigated the laundering of 1 billion taka through streaming apps like BIGO Live by a group of Chinese and Bangladeshi nationals on 13 June 2021. In July 2021, Additional Deputy Inspector General of CID Kamrul Ahsan stated that cryptocurrencies were illegal in Bangladesh which was contradicted by Bangladesh Bank.

On 6 August 2021, the Criminal Investigation Department were handed the cases against Faria Mahbub Piasha, Helena Jahangir, Moriom Akter Mou and Pori Moni who were detained in separate raids by Rapid Action Battalion. Sheikh Omar Faruque, Additional Deputy Inspector General of the Criminal Investigation Department and the investigation officer four was sent into forced retirement by the government of Bangladesh after he was criticised by Bangladesh High Court for violating it's directive by placing Pori Moni on remand multiple times.

Chief Executives

Notable cases
Bangladesh Rifles revolt- The Criminal Investigation Department pressed charges against 824 individuals, civilians and soldiers of Bangladesh Rifles soldiers, on 13 July 2010. The case was investigated by Special Superintendent Abdul Kahar Akand.
2013 Dhaka garment factory collapse
Bangladesh Bank robbery-The Criminal Investigation Department found Bangladesh Bank did not use firewalls and had used cheap second hand equipment.
Murder of Sohagi Jahan Tonu-They interrogated three local Comilla artists in their investigation of Tonu's murder. They failed to solve the crime for four years and then handed over the case to Police Bureau of Investigation in 2020.

Controversy
On 25 November 2017, 11 members of the Criminal Investigation Department were found to have taken 4.5 million taka from recruiting agents by an investigation of the police headquarters. The investigation was started following complaints by the Bangladesh Association of International Recruiting Agencies.

On 20 April 2019, Detective Branch arrested a constable of the Criminal Investigation Department Uttara zone, Taijuddin, and his informant, Abul Bashar, with 990 Yaba pills in Savar Upazila.

On 30 June 2020, Md Imam Hossain, the Joint Commissioner of Dhaka Metropolitan Police, was transferred to the Criminal Investigation Department following a request of the Commissioner of Dhaka Metropolitan Police Md Shafiqul Islam who had alleged that Imran offered him a bribe. He was appointed the additional deputy inspector general of the CID in an order signed by Dhananjay Kumar Das, Deputy Secretary at the Ministry of Home Affairs.  

On 26 August 2021, three officers of the Criminal Investigation Department were arrested after they abducted a man and his mother for ransom. The arrestees are Assistant Superintendent of Police Hasinur Rahman, an assistant sub-inspector, and a constable. The officers were stationed in Rangpur District while the abductee was living in Dinajpur District. They CID officers were denied bail on 1 September 2021 by a Dinapur Court.

On 8 September 2021, Aksaduzzaman, a former Sub Inspector of the Criminal Investigation Department was detained for his involvement in the robbery of a migrant working on his way to the airport to fly to Dubai on 19 October 2020. His wife alleged she gave 1.4 million taka to Kaysar Rizvi Korayshi, Deputy Commissioner of Detective Branch which he denied. Aksaduzzam was placed on the remand of the Detective Branch by Debbrata Biswas, Metropolitan Magistrate, on 9 September 2021.

References

 
Police units of Bangladesh
Domestic intelligence agencies
Bangladeshi intelligence agencies
Government agencies established in 1971
1971 establishments in Bangladesh
Bangladesh Police